Dalem Baturenggong, also called Waturenggong or Enggong, was a King (Dalem) of Bali who is believed to have reigned in the mid 16th century. He is in particular associated with the golden age of the Balinese kingdom of Gelgel, with political expansion and cultural and religious renovation. In Balinese historiography he represented an epic vision of kingship that served as a model for later rulers on the island.

Prosperous reign

Dalem Baturenggong is solely known from much later sources. He is briefly listed as king in the religious texts Usana Bali and Rajapurana Besakih, under the name Enggong. Full details are found in the 18th-century chronicle Babad Dalem. According to this text he was the son of Dalem Ketut, the first King of Gelgel, who reigned around the fall of the Javanese Majapahit empire (early 16th century). He posed as an opponent of Islam and an enemy of Pasuruan and Mataram on Java. His prestige was greatly enhanced by the arrival of the Brahmin Nirartha from Java, who established an ideal relationship between priest and patron and carried out an extensive literary activity. Nirartha is dated in 1537 from one of his texts, which date would then be an approximate floruit of Dalem Baturenggong's reign.

Military expansion

The king proposed to marry the daughter of Sri Juru or Menak Koncar, the King of Blambangan in East Java, but the princess refused. A Balinese army was therefore sent to Blambangan, where it trapped and killed Sri Juru. The children of the slain king fled to Pasuruan on Java's north coast, and Blambangan was brought under Balinese suzerainty. Furthermore, Lombok and West Sumbawa were brought under the authority of Dalem Baturenggong. The king left two sons, Dalem Bekung and Dalem Seganing, who reigned in turn after his death.

The details of his glorious reign can not be verified from contemporary sources. Only the Portuguese writer Fernão Mendes Pinto (c. 1509-1583), in his work Peregrinacam, alleges that Bali was a pagan island dependent on the Javanese Muslim Demak kingdom but rebelled in c. 1546. This information may not be quite trustworthy. However, European sources from the late 16th and 17th centuries describe the Gelgel kingdom in terms reminiscent of the chronicles, and seem to presuppose a strong political expansion between the fall of Majapahit (c. 1527) and the first Dutch visit to Bali (1597).

See also

 History of Bali
 List of monarchs of Bali
 Gelgel, Indonesia

References

Further reading 
 I Wayan Warna et al. (tr.) (1986), Babad Dalem; Teks dan Terjemahan. Denpasar: Dinas Pendidikan dan Kebudayaan Daerah Tingkat I Bali.
 Margaret J. Wiener (1995), Visible and Invisible Realms; Power, Magic, and Colonial Conquest in Bali. Chicago & London: The University of Chicago Press.

History of Bali
Balinese people
Monarchs of Bali
Indonesian Hindu monarchs
16th-century Indonesian people